Nikandros Stylianou (born 22 August 1989) is a Cypriot athlete specialising in the pole vault. He won several medals at the Games of the Small States of Europe. In addition he represented his country at two outdoor and one indoor European Championships as well as three consecutive Commonwealth Games.

His personal bests in the event are 5.55 metres outdoors (Serravalle 2017) and 5.61 metres indoors (Belgrade 2017). The latter is the current national record.

International competitions

1No mark in the final

References

1989 births
Living people
Cypriot male pole vaulters
Athletes (track and field) at the 2010 Commonwealth Games
Athletes (track and field) at the 2014 Commonwealth Games
Athletes (track and field) at the 2018 Commonwealth Games
Commonwealth Games competitors for Cyprus
Athletes (track and field) at the 2013 Mediterranean Games
Mediterranean Games competitors for Cyprus
Sportspeople from Limassol
20th-century Cypriot people
21st-century Cypriot people
Athletes (track and field) at the 2022 Mediterranean Games